Guthrie Center Community School District is a rural, public school district headquartered in Guthrie Center, Iowa.

The district is almost entirely in Guthrie County, with a small portion in Audubon County, and serves the city of Guthrie Center and the surrounding rural areas.

It has entered into a "grade-sharing" relationship with Adair–Casey Community School District in which the latter sends its high school students to the Guthrie Center school. Therefore it serves senior high school students from Adair and Casey.

Schools
Schools include:
 Guthrie Center Elementary School
 AC/GC High School

Under grade-sharing, students attend AC/GC Junior High School in Adair.

AC/GC High School

Athletics
The Chargers compete in the West Central Activities Conference in the following sports:
Cross Country
Volleyball
Football
Basketball
Wrestling
Track and Field
Golf 
Baseball
Softball

See also
List of school districts in Iowa
List of high schools in Iowa

References

External links
 Guthrie Center Community School District and Adair–Casey Community School District

School districts in Iowa
Education in Audubon County, Iowa
Education in Guthrie County, Iowa